Sixsmith may refer to:

Professions
 An occupational surname for someone who made sickles

People
Arthur Sixsmith (1880–1969), Canadian professional ice hockey rover and businessman
Ed Sixsmith (1863–1926), professional baseball player who played catcher
Garnet Sixsmith (1885–1967), Canadian professional ice hockey player
Jane Sixsmith MBE (born 1967), former field hockey player, 1992 Olympic bronze medallist
Martin Sixsmith (born 1954), British author, journalist and radio/television presenter
Paul Sixsmith (born 1971), retired Maltese international footballer
Rufus Sixsmith, character in the film Cloud Atlas

English-language surnames
Occupational surnames
English-language occupational surnames